The 2011 Nigerian Senate election in Imo State was held on April 9, 2011, to elect members of the Nigerian Senate to represent Imo State. Hope Uzodinma representing Imo West and Matthew Ifeanyi Nwagwu representing Imo North won on the platform of Peoples Democratic Party, while Christiana Anyanwu representing Imo East won on the platform of All Progressives Grand Alliance.

Overview

Summary

Results

Imo West 
Peoples Democratic Party candidate Hope Uzodinma won the election, defeating other party candidates.

Imo North 
Peoples Democratic Party candidate Matthew Ifeanyi Nwagwu won the election, defeating other party candidates.

Imo East 
All Progressives Grand Alliance candidate Christiana Anyanwu won the election, defeating other party candidates.

References 

Imo State senatorial elections
Imo State senatorial elections
Imo State Senate elections